The Cabinet of Gustavo Petro has governed Colombia since August 2022. President of Colombia Gustavo Petro was sworn in on 7 August 2022. This has been considered by analysts as the country's first ever left-wing government.

Cabinet

Other appointments

References

See also 
 Council of Ministers of Colombia

Gustavo Petro
Cabinet of Gustavo Petro
Presidency of Gustavo Petro
Petro
Government of Colombia
2022 establishments in Colombia
Cabinets established in 2022
August 2022 events in South America